The PBA Third Conference was the tournament of the Philippine Basketball Association (PBA) from 1990 to 1992.

PBA Third Conference results

Best Import of the Conference